The 2002–03 Kentucky Wildcats men's basketball team represented University of Kentucky. The head coach was Tubby Smith, who was in his sixth season as the Wildcats head coach.  For the program, it was the 100th season of Kentucky Wildcats basketball. The team was a member of the Southeast Conference and played their home games at Rupp Arena.

Roster

Schedule and results

|-
!colspan=9 style="background:#273BE2; color:white;"| Non-conference regular season

|-
!colspan=9 style="background:#273BE2; color:white;"| Conference regular season

|-
!colspan=9 style="background:#273BE2;"| 2003 SEC Tournament

|-
!colspan=9 style="background:#273BE2;"| 2003 NCAA Tournament

Awards and honors
Tubby Smith, Naismith College Coach of the Year

Team players drafted into the NBA

References

External links

Kentucky Wildcats men's basketball seasons
Kentucky Wildcats
Wild
Wild
Kentucky